Ainvelle is a commune in the Haute-Saône département in the Bourgogne-Franche-Comté region of eastern France.

Population

See also
Communes of the Haute-Saône department

References

Communes of Haute-Saône